Horatio King (June 21, 1811 – May 20, 1897) was Postmaster General of the United States under James Buchanan.

Early life
Born in Paris, Maine, he received a common school education, and at the age of 18 entered the office of the Paris Jeffersonian, where he learned printing, afterward becoming owner and editor of the paper. In 1833 he moved it to Portland, where he published it until 1838.

Postal career
In 1839 he went to Washington, D.C., having been appointed clerk in the post office department, and was gradually promoted. In 1854 he was appointed first Assistant Postmaster General, and in January, 1861, while acting as Postmaster General, he was questioned by a member of Congress from South Carolina with regard to the franking privilege. In his reply, King was the first to officially deny the power of a state to separate from the Union. He was then appointed Postmaster General, serving from  February 12 until March 5, 1861.

Later life

On retiring from office, he remained in Washington, D.C., during the Civil War, serving on a board of commissioners to carry into execution the emancipation law in the District of Columbia. His efforts led to a considerable number of former slaves settling in the District.

After his retirement from office, King practiced in Washington as an attorney before the executive department and international commissions. He was active in procuring the passage of three acts in 1874, 1879, and 1885 respectively, requiring the use of the official "penalty envelope," which has secured a large saving to the government. He also took an active part in the work of completing the Washington Monument, serving as secretary of the Monument Society from 1881. King was a frequent contributor to the press, and published An Oration before the Union Literary Society of Washington (Washington, D.C., 1841), and Sketches of Travel; or, Twelve Months in Europe (1878).

He was married twice. In 1846 he married Anne Collins in Maine. They had three children: Anne, Horatio Collins and Henry Franklin.  After her death, he married Isabella E. Osborn in Washington in 1875. In 1881, he purchased land in West Newton, MA and built a house there on the corner of Temple and Sterling Streets which he and his wife Isabelle used as a summer residence, near the home of their son, Henry Franklin King.

King was buried in Washington's Congressional Cemetery. He was the last surviving member of the Buchanan cabinet.

Notes

References

External links

University of Virginia Miller Center https://millercenter.org/president/buchanan/essays/king-1861-postmaster-general

1811 births
1897 deaths
United States Postmasters General
People of Washington, D.C., in the American Civil War
Union (American Civil War) political leaders
People from Paris, Maine
Burials at the Congressional Cemetery
Maine Democrats
Buchanan administration cabinet members
19th-century American politicians